Handball at the 2015 European Youth Summer Olympic Festival was a handball competition at the 2015 European Youth Summer Olympic Festival held in Tbilisi, Georgia, between 26 July and 1 August 2015.

Medalist events

References

2015 European Youth Summer Olympic Festival
2015 in handball
Handball at the European Youth Summer Olympic Festival